Your Favorite Weapon is the debut studio album by American rock band Brand New, released in 2001. The album consists largely of power chord-heavy pop punk songs, detailing the highs and lows of teenage relationships and experiences. Over time, as the band's sound changed drastically, many songs from the album have been phased out of the band's live shows. 

A 2004 interview with Kerrang! described the band as feeling "somewhat ashamed" of the album.

Background 
Vocalist/guitarist Jesse Lacey, bassist Garrett Tierney and drummer Brian Lane played in a band called The Rookie Lot with Brandon Reilly before the band eventually broke up. After a period of inactivity between Lacey, Tierney and Lane, the trio formed Brand New in Long Island, NY in 2000. The name came from Lane and Reilly. Reilly went on to play in The Movielife. Shortly afterwards, the band acquired guitarist Vincent Accardi, who had previously played in One Last Goodbye. The band self-released a demo, and the band started gaining attention outside of their home state after touring with Midtown and Glassjaw. Lane had a job working at a recording studio which the band would use to record material. The band signed to Triple Crown after their second-ever show. Fred from Triple Crown was initially interested in hardcore band Home Town Hero, a band that featured Tierney and Lane, but by the time Fred contacted Lane Home Town Hero had been broken-up for six months. Instead, Brand New sent Fred their demo. Lacey said the label was "excellent" for the band "in every way".

Composition and recording 
Asked about his influences, Lacey replied Lifetime, Foo Fighters, The Cars and The Smiths. The band would listen to several bands while in their van, such as Saves the Day, Modest Mouse and Green Day, among others. All of the songs on the album were written, according to Accardi, "within our whole teenage years. Some songs were written two or three years before the record came out." "The Shower Scene" references actress Janet Leigh's story in the film Psycho. The title of "Jude Law and a Semester Abroad" references actor Jude Law. "Failure by Design" is about Lacey experiencing writer's block. "Seventy Times 7" was written about a feud between Lacey and Taking Back Sunday guitarist John Nolan. Nolan wrote about the feud from his point of view in Taking Back Sunday's "There's No 'I' in Team". The name of the song is a reference to a Bible passage, specifically Matthew 18:22. "Soco Amaretto Lime" was written for Lacey's friend Peter and about Lacey's girlfriend. Peter saw the band "the way we [...] have changed in the last couple years." People were giving Lacey's girlfriend "shit for wanting to be with me. [...] they were being spiteful, and old, and envious. [...] That's where the last lines in the song came from."

Your Favorite Weapon was produced by Mike Sapone, a friend of the band. The whole album was re-recorded when the original recording was lost on a computer's hard drive. All of the songs on the band's demo were re-recorded for the album. The band later admitted that they did not like the overall sound of the album.

Release

Original release and touring 
Your Favorite Weapon was released through Triple Crown on October 9, 2001. Between late October and late November, the band toured the U.S. with support from The Reunion Show. In January and February 2002 toured the U.S. with support from Further Seems Forever, Recover and Hot Rod Circuit. The band then went on a spring tour in May and early June with Finch, The Starting Line and Autopilot Off. The band went on a short tour with Dashboard Confessional in early June. In June, the band was supported by Thrice and Recover. In late June, Iodine Recordings released Your Favorite Weapon on vinyl along with an extra track, "...My Nine Rides Shotgun". A music video for "Jude Law and a Semester Abroad" was released through Much Music in July. It was filmed at Skate and Surf Festival. The band went on a summer tour with Taking Back Sunday and Rufio. In September, it was announced the band had re-recorded "Jude Law and a Semester Abroad" for a potential release to radio.

Brand New supported Face to Face for a week's worth of shows between late September and early October. The band then toured with The Movielife between mid October and early December, with support from The Reunion Show and Orange Island. In November, the band released the re-recorded version of "Jude Law and a Semester Abroad" on MP3.com. The album was released in the UK on March 10, 2003, through Eat Sleep. Also in March, the band went on a tour of the UK with Finch. Between late April and early May, the band toured the U.S. with support by A Static Lullaby and Orange Island. Hot Rod Circuit was originally announced to support the band, before being replaced by The Early November. The band ended the touring cycle with a show in New York to a crowd of 5,000 people. "Jude Law and a Semester Abroad" was released as a single in the UK on June 2.

Reissues and legacy 
On February 9, 2004, the album was released in Australia through Below Par. With the success of their second album, Déjà Entendu (2003), Razor & Tie reissued Your Favorite Weapon on April 22. The album was reissued in Australia through Cortex on May 5, 2007. Triple Crown hosted a 10th anniversary show of the label in December 2007. At this show, the band played the album in full, with the exception of "Seventy Times 7" which was played as the encore and "Moshi Moshi" was played in its place. On November 29, 2011, Razor & Tie released a 10th anniversary edition of the album, with seven demos as bonus tracks and new cover art. The new cover art was taken by Derrick Sherman. A vinyl release followed on December 13. The band played the album in full again for New Year's Eve in 2011.

Reception 

Your Favorite Weapon found "cult-like success", according to CMJ New Music Monthly writer Arye Dworken. By July 2003 the album had sold 50,000 copies. Prior to the 2011 reissue, the album had sold over 315,000 copies. It has received positive reviews from critics. The album was included at number 15 on Rock Sounds "The 51 Most Essential Pop Punk Albums of All Time" list. BuzzFeed included the album at number 6 on their "36 Pop Punk Albums You Need To Hear Before You F——ing Die" list. NME listed the album as one of "20 Pop Punk Albums Which Will Make You Nostalgic". "Soco Amaretto Lime" was included on Alternative Presss "11 Classic Summer Jams" list.

Track listing 

Bonus tracks

Personnel 

 Jesse Lacey – vocals, rhythm guitar
 Vincent Accardi – lead guitar, backing vocals
 Garrett Tierney – bass
 Brian Lane – drums, percussion

References 
 Footnotes

 Citations

Sources

External links 

Your Favorite Weapon at YouTube (streamed copy where licensed)

2001 debut albums
Brand New (band) albums
Triple Crown Records albums
Albums produced by Mike Sapone